Benjamin Luther Watson (born July 27, 1959) is an American politician who has served in the Georgia State Senate from the 1st District since he was appointed in 2014. He previously served in the Georgia House of Representatives from 2010 to 2014. Watson is an active member of the Republican Party, and he has also been a part of various committees and caucuses in the state of Georgia.

Background and education 
Ben was born in 1959 and grew up in Twin City, Georgia. He now resides in Isle of Hope, Georgia with his wife, Bernice, who is a Savannah-Chatham Public School teacher, and their three sons.

Ben graduated high school from the Emanuel County Institute in 1977 and graduated with a BA from the University of Georgia in 1981. He earned his medical degree from the Medical College of Georgia.

Career 
Ben's career is pretty easy to follow. After getting his MD, he has worked as a primary care physician in Savannah. He practices internal medicine at SouthCoast Medical Group where he specializes in elderly patients. He has practiced medicine at SouthCoast Medical Group since 1988 and still works there today.

Ben began his career in politics by becoming a representative in the Georgia State House of Representatives for District 166 in 2010. He represented Georgia's 163rd District from 2010 to 2013 and then represented District 166 from 2013 to 2015. In 2014, he was elected Senator in the Georgia State Senate in District 1. He took over the seat from Sen. Buddy Carter, R-Pooler, who campaigned for a higher spot in Congress.

List of Current Legislative Committees:

 Member, Appropriations
 Chair, Health and Human Services
 Member, Insurance and Labor
 Member, Public Safety
 Member, Subcommittee on General Welfare and Safety
 Member, Subcommittee on Healthcare Delivery and Access
 Member, Subcommittee on Scope of Practice
 Member, Transportation
 Member, Veterans, Military and Homeland Security

List of Former Committees/Caucuses:

 Member, Georgia State Senate Appropriations Committee, present
 Member, Georgia State Senate Ethics Committee, present
 Member, Georgia State Senate Health and Human Services Committee, present
 Member, Georgia State Senate Public Safety Committee, present
 Member, Georgia State Senate Retirement Committee, present
 Member, Georgia State Senate Transportation Committee, present
 Chair, Georgia State Senate Veterans, Military, and Homeland Security Committee, present
 Former Vice Chair, Economic Development and Tourism Committee, Georgia State Senate
 Former Member, Ethics Committee, Georgia State Senate
 Former Member, Georgia State House of Representatives Appropriations Committee, Health Subcommittee
 Former Member, Georgia State House of Representatives Health and Human Services Committee
 Former Member, Georgia State House of Representatives Higher Education Committee
 Former Secretary, Georgia State House of Representatives Science and Technology Committee
 Former Member, Subcommittee on Abusive Billing Practices, Georgia State Senate
 Former Member, Subcommittee on Community Health, Georgia State Senate
 Former Member, Subcommittee on Insurance, Georgia State Senate
 Former Member, Subcommittee on Pharmacology, Georgia State Senate

Elections

Georgia State Senate

2020 
In the November 3rd, 2020 election, Ben Watson ran for re-election to the Georgia State Senate to represent District 1 as a Republican incumbent. He initially ran against a Democratic challenger, Kerri McGinty, who withdrew from the race on September 30, 2020. Watson will carry out an additional term in his current seat for 2 more years.

2018 
Ben Watson defeated Democratic challenger Sandra Workman in the general election for Georgia State Senate District 1 on November 6, 2018. Watson received 61% of the total votes cast. Ben was not challenged in the Republican Primary.

2014 - 2016 
Ben Watson ran unopposed in the Georgia State Senate District 1 general elections in 2014 and 2016.

Georgia House of Representatives

2010
The Georgia State House of Representatives District 163 was left vacant by Representative Burke Day (R) in 2010. Ben Watson, Joe Welch and Gary Wisenbaker competed in the Republican primary on July 20 for the Republican nomination in a majority Republican district. Watson managed to avoid the almost certain runoff which would have been required by Georgia State Law if none of the three candidates reached 50.01% of the vote. Watson garnered 64.5% of the vote to Welches's 18.7% and Wisenbaker's 16.9%. In the November 2 General Election, Watson defeated Jeremy Scheinbart (D) with 80.2% of the vote.

References

1959 births
Living people
People from Emanuel County, Georgia
Physicians from Georgia (U.S. state)
Medical College of Georgia alumni
University of Georgia alumni
Republican Party members of the Georgia House of Representatives
Republican Party Georgia (U.S. state) state senators
21st-century American politicians